Rubus sieboldii, the Molucca raspberry, is a flowering plant in the genus Rubus. The species is native to Australia, and mid-western Asia, in the Himalaya Mountains and foothills. The shrubs prefer low wetland areas, with very good sun exposure, though the plants can tolerate moderate shade.

Uses
The plant's leaves stimulate blood flow in the pelvic area and uterus. They are also abortifacient and astringent, lending to their use to treat urinary tract infections. Molucca Raspberries are edible, and contain large amounts of antioxidant power. They are rich with bioactive phytochemicals, antioxidant compounds, and show stronger radical scavenging activities than blueberries.

References

External links
 

sieboldii
Flora of Asia
Flora of Australia
Medicinal plants
Plants described in 1826